Elections to Fife Council were held on 3 May 2012, the same day as the other Scottish local government elections. The election used the 23 wards created as a result of the Local Governance (Scotland) Act 2004, with each ward electing three or four Councillors using the single transferable vote system form of proportional representation, with 78 Councillors elected.

The biggest benefactors were the Labour Party who regained the 11 seats they had lost in the 2007 Local Elections thus increase its share to remain the largest party.   Scottish Liberal Democrats lost over half their seats, with labour picking up most of the seats, while the Scottish National Party increased their representation by 3 seats and remained in second place on the authority.  Most of their gains were in the wards of the Fife North East constituency where they had previously only had a single seat.  The Independents lost a seat while the Scottish Conservative and Unionist Party lost 2 seats. The UK Independence Party lost its only Scottish Councillor who had defected from the Conservatives in 2008.

Following the election the Labour Party formed a minority administration with the support of the Independents and the Conservative Party. This replaced the previous SNP - Lib Dem coalition administration.

Election results

Note: "Votes" are the first preference votes. The net gain/loss and percentage changes relate to the result of the previous Scottish local elections on 3 May 2007. This may differ from other published sources showing gain/loss relative to seats held at dissolution of Scotland's councils.

Ward results
Obelisks (†) indicate changes since the election, and link to further details.

West Fife and Coastal Villages
2007: 1xLab; 1xLib Dem; 1xSNP; 1xIndependent
2012: 2xLab; 1xSNP; 1xIndependent
2007-2012 Change: Lab gain one seat from Lib Dem

Dunfermline North
2007: 1xLib Dem; 1xLab; 1xSNP
2012: 2xLab; 1xSNP
2007-2012 Change: Lab gain one seat from Lib Dem

Dunfermline Central
2007: 2xLib Dem; 1xLab; 1xSNP
2012: 2xLab; 1xLib Dem; 1xSNP
2007-2012 Change: Lab gain one seat from Lib Dem

Dunfermline South
2007: 2xLib Dem; 1xSNP; 1xLab
2012: 2xLab; 1xLib Dem; 1xSNP
2007-2012 Change: Lab gain one seat from Lib Dem

Rosyth
2007: 1xSNP; 1xLab; 1xLib Dem
2012: 2xLab; 1xSNP
2007-2012: Lab gain one seat from Lib Dem

Inverkeithing and Dalgety Bay
2007: 1xSNP; 1xLab; 1xLib Dem; 1xCon
2012: 2xLab; 1xSNP; 1xCon
2007-2012 Change: Lab gain one seat from Lib Dem

= Outgoing Councillor from a different Ward.

The Lochs
2007: 1xIndependent; 1xLab; 1xSNP
2012: 1xLab; 1xIndependent; 1xSNP
2007-2012 Change: No change

Cowdenbeath
2007: 1xLab; 1xIndependent; 1xSNP
2012: 2xLab; 1xSNP
2007-2012 Change: Lab gain one seat from Independent

Lochgelly and Cardenden
2007: 2xLab; 1xSNP
2012: 2xLab; 1xSNP
2007-2012 Change: No change

Burntisland, Kinghorn and Western Kirkcaldy
2007: 1xSNP; 1xLab; 1xLib Dem
2012: 1xLab; 1xSNP; 1xLib Dem
2007-2012 Change: No change

Kirkcaldy North
2007: 2xLab; 1xSNP
2012: 2xLab; 1xSNP
2007-2012 Change: No change

Kirkcaldy Central
2007: 1xSNP; 1xLab; 1xLib Dem
2012: 2xLab; 1xSNP
2007-2012 Change: Lab gain one seat from Lib Dem

Kirkcaldy East
2007: 2xLab; 1xSNP
2012: 2xLab; 1xSNP
2007-2012 Change: No change

Glenrothes West and Kinglassie
2007: 2xSNP; 2xLab
2012: 2xSNP; 2xLab
2007-2012 Change: No change

Glenrothes North, Leslie and Markinch
2007: 2xSNP; 2xLab
2012: 2xSNP; 2xLab
2007-2012 Change: No change

Glenrothes Central and Thornton
2007: 2xSNP; 1xLab
2012: 2xLab; 1xSNP
2007-2012 Change: Lab gain one seat from SNP

Howe of Fife and Tay Coast
2007: 2xLib Dem; 1xSNP
2012: 1xLib Dem; 1xSNP; 1xCon
2007-2012 Change: Con gain one seat from Lib Dem

Tay Bridgehead
2007: 2xLib Dem; 1xCon
2012: 2xLib Dem; 1xSNP
2007-2012 Change: SNP gain one seat from Con

St. Andrews
2007: 3xLib Dem; 1xCon
2012: 1xCon; 1xSNP; 1xLib Dem; 1xLab
2007-2012 Change: SNP and Lab each gain one seat from Lib Dem

East Neuk and Landward
2007: 2xLib Dem; 1xCon
2012: 2xLib Dem; 1xSNP
2007-2012 Change: SNP gain one seat from UKIP

Cupar
2007: 1xLib Dem; 1xIndependent; 1xCon
2012: 1xIndependent; 1xLib Dem; 1xSNP
2007-2012 Change: SNP gain one seat from Con

Leven, Kennoway and Largo
2007: 2xSNP; 1xLab; 1xLib Dem
2012: 2xLab; 2xSNP
2007-2012 Change: Lab gain one seat from Lib Dem

Buckhaven, Methil and Wemyss Villages
2007: 2xLab; 1xIndependent; 1xSNP
2012: 2xLab; 1xIndependent; 1xSNP
2007-2012 Change: No change

Changes since the election

By-elections 
The detailed results of the 12 by-elections are as follows:

External links 
 Fife Council website - local government elections
 ScottishElections by Kristofer Keane

References 

2012 Scottish local elections
2012
21st century in Fife
May 2012 events in the United Kingdom